AGPS may refer to:

 Assisted GPS
 Alkylglycerone phosphate synthase
 Australian Government Publishing Service